Cemetery Road is a tram stop on the East Manchester Line (EML) of Greater Manchester's light-rail Metrolink system. It opened on 11 February 2013, after a three-day free trial for local residents. The station was constructed as part of Phase 3a of the Metrolink's expansion, and is located in Droylsden at the junction of Manchester Road and Cemetery Road, a part of Tameside, England.

Services

Services are mostly every 12 minutes on all routes.

Connecting bus routes
Cemetery Road is directly served by Stagecoach Manchester bus service 216, which stops next to the station on Manchester Road and replicates the tram route between Piccadilly Gardens and Ashton-under-Lyne. Stagecoach/JPT services 217 and 218, which also stops on Manchester Road, run circular routes between Manchester and Mossley serving Droylsden, Dukinfield, Ashton, Tameside General Hospital and Stalybridge.

References

External links
Cemetery Road Stop Information
Cemetery Road area map
 Light Rail Transit Association

Tram stops in Tameside
Tram stops on the Bury to Ashton-under-Lyne line